Dorchester County is a county located in the U.S. state of Maryland. At the 2020 census, the population was 32,531. Its county seat is Cambridge. The county was formed in 1669 and named for the Earl of Dorset, a family friend of the Calverts (the founding family of the Maryland colony).

Dorchester County comprises the Cambridge, MD Micropolitan Statistical Area, which is also included in the Salisbury-Cambridge, MD-DE Combined Statistical Area. It is located on the Eastern Shore of Maryland.

Dorchester County is the largest county by total area on the Eastern Shore. It is bordered by the Choptank River to the north, Talbot County to the northwest, Caroline County to the northeast, Wicomico County to the southeast, Sussex County, Delaware, to the east, and the Chesapeake Bay to the west. Dorchester County uses the slogan, "The Heart of Chesapeake Country", due to its geographical location and the heart-like shape of the county on a map.

History
Many residents of Dorchester County have historically been watermen and farmers. The Chesapeake Bay and its tributaries provide harvests of crabs, oysters and many fish species to both commercial and recreational fishermen. Dorchester County was the birthplace of Harriet Tubman, who escaped from slavery and afterward worked to guide other refugee slaves to freedom in the North.

Dorchester County has been hit by two deadly tornadoes. The first occurred on June 23, 1944, in Cambridge, where two people were killed and 33 were injured. The other was on May 8, 1984, in Hurlock, where one death and six injuries were reported. Both storms caused between 500,000 and 5 million dollars of damage.

Politics, government and law
Dorchester County operates under the charter home rule form of government, and the affairs of the county are managed by five county council members. Each is elected from a single-member district defined within the county. Meetings of the county council are held weekly. The agenda and the minutes of each week's proceedings are public record.

The white population of Dorchester has historically voted very conservatively. Along with rock-ribbed Unionist Garrett County, located in Appalachia, its white majority was one of only two Maryland counties to vote for Barry Goldwater in 1964. During the following election, Dorchester was the only county in the state where the segregationist George Wallace outpolled either Nixon or Humphrey. In the late 20th century, white conservatives in the South shifted from the Democratic to the Republican Party. Since then the only Democratic presidential nominee to carry Dorchester County was southern native son Bill Clinton in 1996.

The county has trended less conservative in recent years, with Democrat Barack Obama coming within five percentage points of beating Mitt Romney in the 2012 presidential election; Obama won nationally. In earlier times, unlike highly secessionist Wicomico, Worcester, Queen Anne's and Cecil counties, Dorchester was a swing county in the late 19th century due to the voting power of its freedman population, who strongly supported the Republican Party. The conservative whites voted Democratic for William Jennings Bryan in 1908, after Maryland had passed laws raising barriers to voter registration among blacks, resulting in a dramatic drop in their voting until after passage of civil rights legislation in the 1960s.

Law enforcement
The county is policed by the Dorchester County Sheriff's Office (DSO), the Maryland State Police, and the DNR Police. The DSO is a full service agency, headed by Sheriff James W. Phillips Jr. since December 2002.

Geography
It is the largest county in Maryland by area.

Climate
Dorchester has a humid subtropical climate (Cfa) according to the Köppen climate classification. The Trewartha climate classification.has only the area near the bay as Cf and the remainder of the county as oceanic (Do.) Average monthly temperatures in Cambridge range from 36.1 °F in January to 78.4 °F in July.

Adjacent counties
Caroline County (north and northeast)
Sussex County, Delaware (east)
Talbot County (north)
Somerset County (southeast)
Saint Mary's County (southwest)
Wicomico County (east and southeast)
Calvert County (west)

National protected area
 Blackwater National Wildlife Refuge

Demographics

Dorchester County is sparsely populated and is the least densely populated county in Maryland. The largest town is Cambridge with a population of 12,326 as of the 2010 census. Much of this county is made up of marshlands, forest, and farmland.

2000 census
At the 2000 census, there were 30,674 people, 12,706 households and 8,500 families residing in the county. The population density was 55 per square mile (21/km2). There were 14,681 housing units at an average density of 26 per square mile (10/km2). The racial makeup of the county was 69.45% White, 28.39% Black or African American, 0.23% Native American, 0.66% Asian, 0.00% Pacific Islander, 0.39% from other races, and 0.89% from two or more races. 1.26% of the population was Hispanic or Latino of any race. 20.1% were of American, 12.7% English, 9.8% German and 8.2% Irish ancestry.

There were 12,706 households, of which 27.30% had children under the age of 18 living with them, 47.50% were married couples living together, 15.50% had a female householder with no husband present, and 33.10% were non-families. 28.20% of all households were made up of individuals, and 13.50% had someone living alone who was 65 years of age or older. The average household size was 2.36 and the average family size was 2.86.

23.30% of the population were under the age of 18, 6.70% from 18 to 24, 26.80% from 25 to 44, 25.50% from 45 to 64, and 17.70% who were 65 years of age or older. The median age was 41 years. For every 100 females there were 89.80 males. For every 100 females age 18 and over, there were 86.40 males.

The median household income was $34,077 and the median family income was $41,917. Males had a median income of $29,014 and females $22,284. The per capita income was $18,929. 13.80% of the population and 10.10% of families were below the poverty line. 18.10% of those under the age of 18 and 14.20% of those 65 and older were living below the poverty line.

2010 census
At the 2010 United States Census, there were 32,618 people, 13,522 households and 8,894 families residing in the county. The racial makeup of the county was 67.6% white, 27.7% black or African American, 0.9% Asian, 0.3% American Indian, 1.4% from other races, and 1.9% from two or more races. Those of Hispanic or Latino origin made up 3.5% of the population. In terms of ancestry, 17.0% were American, 13.9% were English, 11.4% were German, and 11.1% were Irish.

Of the 13,522 households, 28.7% had children under the age of 18 living with them, 44.6% were married couples living together, 16.0% had a female householder with no husband present, 34.2% were non-families, and 28.4% of all households were made up of individuals. The average household size was 2.37 and the average family size was 2.88. The median age was 43.3 years.

The median household income was $45,151 and the median family income was $56,662. Males had a median income of $40,814 and females $30,184. The per capita income was $25,139. About 9.5% of families and 13.4% of the population were below the poverty line, including 19.4% of those under age 18 and 9.2% of those age 65 or over.
In 2010, the racial makeup of the county was 66.16% Non-Hispanic whites, 27.70% blacks, 0.34% Native Americans, 0.92% Asians, 0.03% Pacific Islanders, 0.09% Non-Hispanics from some other race, 1.64% Non-Hispanics reporting two or more races and 3.64% Hispanic or Latino.

Education

Public schools

Dorchester County School of Technology
Choptank Elementary School
Hurlock Elementary School
Maple Elementary School
Sandy Hill Elementary School
South Dorchester K-8
Vienna Elementary School
Warwick Elementary School
Mace's Lane Middle School
North Dorchester Middle School
Cambridge South Dorchester High School
North Dorchester High School

Media
The local newspapers are The Dorchester Banner and The Dorchester Star (a free, weekly publication).  A regional newspaper, The Star Democrat, serves several counties on the Mid-Shore, including Dorchester.

Dorchester County is included in the coverage area of local television stations WBOC, WMDT and WRDE-LD. It also receives coverage from television stations based in Baltimore and Washington, D.C. It is also by a local LPFM radio station, WHCP-LP (101.5FM), operated by the locally based non-profit Cambridge Community Radio, Inc.

Communities

City
Cambridge (county seat)

Towns

Brookview
Church Creek
East New Market
Eldorado
Galestown
Hurlock
Secretary
Vienna

Census-designated places
 Algonquin 
 Elliott 
 Fishing Creek 
 Madison 
 Taylors Island

Non-census designated places
 Salem

Notable people
Harriet Tubman - abolitionist hero
John Barth - author

See also
National Register of Historic Places listings in Dorchester County, Maryland

References

External links

Dorchester County Office of Tourism
Dorchester County Economic Development Office

 
1669 establishments in Maryland
Maryland counties
Maryland counties on the Chesapeake Bay
Populated places established in 1669